Kudian (also Romanized as Kūdīān; also known as Ahel, Ahl, Ehel, Kadīūn, Kodīān, Kodnān, and Kodyān) is a village in Kal Rural District, Eshkanan District, Lamerd County, Fars Province, Iran. At the 2006 census, its population was 777, in 174 families.

References 

Populated places in Lamerd County